The 2015–16 season was Pyunik's 22nd season in the Armenian Premier League.

Season events

Squad

Transfers

In

Loans in

Released

Friendlies

Competitions

Overall record

Supercup

Premier League

Results summary

Results

Table

Armenian Cup

UEFA Champions League

Qualifying rounds

Statistics

Appearances and goals

|-
|colspan="16"|Youth Players:

|-
|colspan="16"|Players away on loan:
|-
|colspan="16"|Players who left Pyunik during the season:

|}

Goal scorers

Clean sheets

Disciplinary Record

References

FC Pyunik seasons
Pyunik
Pyunik